Vogts is a surname, and may refer to:

 Berti Vogts (born 30 December 1946), German football player and manager
 Howard C. Vogts (1929 – 7 August 2010), American football coach